Amy Bender is a sports reporter and producer. Her husband Trey Bender is also a sportscaster.

Biography
Bender grew up as a fan of the Kansas City Royals where she was a huge fan of George Brett and she learned how to do his batting average when she was in third grade. Amy hails a family of sportscasters; Gary and Trey. Unlike Gary and Trey whom they graduated from the University of Kansas, Amy graduated from the University of Utah, where she went to work in the sports information office. She was also the host of Countdown to London, a show on the Universal Sports Network.

Bender formerly hosted college cheerleading championships on ESPN and ESPN2. She is currently hosting The Cheerleading Worlds on ESPN & ESPN2 with Amanda Borden.

Bender has worked in the markets of Salt Lake City, Phoenix (like Gary and Trey), and Chicago and does play-by-play and sideline reporting for FSN West.
Amy was sports anchor for KPHO-TV, a CBS affiliate in Phoenix as well as a sports producer. She also hosted Sportspage where celebrities made their way onto the set. She served as a producer for the Utah Jazz Radio Network and also worked in the media and public relations department. She is the mother of American actress Landry Bender.

References

External links
Bender biography at The Mandel Group website

American television producers
American women television producers
American television sports anchors
American talk radio hosts
American women radio presenters
College football announcers
American radio producers
Living people
Year of birth missing (living people)
21st-century American women
Women radio producers